Joseph Georges Bouchard (born April 23, 1888 in Saint-Philippe-de-Néri, Quebec, Canada-died August 4, 1956) was a Canadian politician, agrologist and teacher. He was acclaimed to the House of Commons of Canada in 1922 as a Member of the Liberal Party to represent the riding of Kamouraska. He was elected in the elections of 1925, 1926, 1930 and 1935. During his time in office, he also authored numerous books.

Archives 
There are Joseph Georges Bouchard fonds at the Société Historique de la Côte-du-Sud (fonds F002) and Library and Archives Canada (fonds 

R13132).

External links
 

1888 births
1956 deaths
Liberal Party of Canada MPs
Members of the House of Commons of Canada from Quebec
Université Laval alumni
Academic staff of Université Laval